Yadgar-e-Ghalib (English: In Memory of Ghalib), also spelled Yadgare Ghalib or Yadgar-i-Ghalib, is an 1897 biography of Urdu poet Ghalib, written by his fellow writer and disciple Altaf Hussain Hali (1837–1914). It is considered to be the first authentic work on Ghalib's life, personality, poetry and prose.

Background
Hali was the disciple of Ghalib. He was deeply affected by Ghalib's death in 1869, writing a sensitive elegy on Ghalib. Friends pressed him to compile a biography of Ghalib. However his preoccupation with other works prevented him from undertaking this work early and the biography ultimately published in 1897.

Contents
In the first part of the book, covering about a hundred pages, Hali has given whatever he could gather as regards the life of Ghalib. In the second part of the book, Hali has evaluated Ghalib as an author, as a poet of Urdu and Persian and as a prose writer.

Hali's general approach to Ghalib's poetry and personality borders on defence, glossing over the poet's personal shortcomings and providing relief by a perceptive analysis and interpretation of his poems.

Reception
Universally regarded as a classic, Yadgar-e-Ghalib is considered to be the first authentic work on Ghalib's life, personality, poetry and prose.

References

Citations

Sources

External links
 Yadgar-e-Ghalib at Columbia University (Urdu)
  (English translation)

Ghalib
1897 non-fiction books
Urdu-language books
Indian biographies
Biographies about writers